Championship Manager 2006 is a computer game in Eidos' Championship Manager series. It is essentially a seasonal update for Championship Manager 5. The game was developed by Beautiful Game Studios (BGS) and was released on Windows on March 31, 2006.

Key features
Possibly the most anticipated new feature for CM 2006 is the updated "Gameplan" 3D match engine, which Eidos/BGS describe as a "3D representation of a football match" . It is not the FIFA/PES-style 3D match engine that some fans have been crying out for but it is another step along from the top-down 2D view. The developers have improved on CM5's single isometric view by promising 11 different camera angles to view the match from.

Player interaction has also been improved greatly, offering 32 different types of interaction - things such as player fines, homesickness and relationships with other players in the team.

The game also includes a more accurate and fully up-to-date database of players and clubs. It does not feature any additional playable leagues to the 26 found CM5, but while this will be a disappointment for some fans, the developers insist that this will help them to improve the quality of data found in the existing playable leagues.

Other versions
A handheld version of the game has been released for Sony's PlayStation Portable on April 7, 2006.
A console version developed by Gusto Games has been released on Xbox and PlayStation 2 in May 2006.
A mobile version of the game, Championship Manager 2006 Mobile  was developed by BAFTA award-winning developer  Dynamo Games

International update
On 2 June 2006, to tie in with the 2006 FIFA World Cup, an update pack was released on the Championship Manager website, for the PC. This pack fixed minor problems with the original release of the game, and also included a new mode, as never seen before since Beautiful Game Studios took over the series: International Management Mode. The mode allows players to take control of international teams, and take them through their international competitions, such as the world cup.

Glitches
Before the International Update, there were many glitches and problems in the game. A few players playing for Forest Green Rovers had extremely high attributes, but they were still worth only about £40,000. The most famous players were Alex Meechan and Bruno Teixeira. There was also another glitch that let the player buy players without paying wages, among others.

There are also several South American players whose value is far less than the statistics of the player when first bought.
On the Xbox version there are fake players on Manchester United, Chelsea F.C., Plymouth Argyle to name a few.

Some players, such as Cesar Daniel Caceres Canete and Danilo Belic, were the wrong age in the game. Canete started the game as an eight-year-old and Belic 14, meaning that they keep improving for several years.

Some player histories failed to show transfers and instead shows the player's whole career at the one club.

A final glitch let you change the transfer status and value of players you have out on loan, meaning that if you can loan a player you can later sign them for free and often on a lower contract.

See also
Football Manager 2006

Notes

External links
Official Championship Manager website
6MB video of CM2006 - A goal in the new match engine, viewed from the "West TV" camera angle.
Eurogamer review of CM2006

2006 video games
Eidos Interactive games
PlayStation 2 games
PlayStation Portable games
Windows games
Xbox games
Association football management video games
Video games developed in the United Kingdom